Lily on the Beach is the thirty-seventh major release and nineteenth studio album by Tangerine Dream. The track "Radio City" was the first appearance of future TD member Jerome Froese, son of founding member Edgar Froese, while the track "Long Island Sunset" was the first time the saxophone was used in a TD track.

Track listing

Personnel
 Edgar Froese – keyboards, lead guitars, drums
 Paul Haslinger – keyboards, rhythm guitars, Chapman Stick, drums
 Jerome Froese – lead guitar on "Radio City"
 Hubert Waldner – soprano sax and flute on "Long Island Sunset"
 Norman Moore – cover art and design
 Ian Logan – cover photograph
 Monica Froese – photo concept

References

1989 albums
Tangerine Dream albums
Private Music albums